FC Blau-Weiß Linz or BW Linz are an Austrian association football
club playing in the Second League in the current 2020–21 season.

History

In 1997, FC Blau-Weiß Linz was founded, which adopted the traditions of the defunct club FC Linz, which due to financial difficulties had to finally dissolve, by merger with their long-time rivals LASK Linz.

Stadium
FC Blau-Weiß Linz played their home matches at Linzer Stadion, but they have plans to develop their own stadium, Donaustadion, to accommodate nearly 5,400 people by 2023.

Current squad
Updated 31 August 2022.

Staff and board members

 Manager: Ronald Brunmayr

Manager history

 Unknown (1997–1998)
  Adam Kensy (1998–2003)
  Gerald Perzy (2003)
  Günther Zeller (2003–2004)
  Gerald Perzy (2004)
  Dieter Mirnegg (2004–2005)
  Gerald Perzy (2005)
  Adolf Blutsch (2005–2007)
  Samir Hasanovic (2007)
  Erwin Spiegel (2007–2008)
  Gerald Perzy (2008)
  Adam Kensy (2008–2011)
  Gerald Perzy (2011)
  Thomas Weissenböck (2011–2012)
  Gerald Perzy (2012)
  Edi Stöhr (2012–2013)
  Yahya Genc (2013–2014)
  Wilhelm Wahlmüller (2014–2016)
  Max Babler (2016)
  Klaus Schmidt (2016–2017)
  Günther Gorenzel-Simonitsch (2017–)

References

External links
 http://www.blauweiss-linz.at/  Official Website

 
Blau-Weiss Linz, FC
1997 establishments in Austria
Sport in Linz
Association football clubs established in 1997